Tariq Chihab (born 22 November 1975) is a retired Moroccan footballer.

Club career
After leaving Moroccan club SC Chabab Mohammedia, Chihab began his Swiss career at FC Zürich. Chihab proved proficient across the field for Zürich, playing offensive and defensive midfield, supporting striker and dedicated defender. At the end of his contract, Chihab was contracted by FC Zürich rival Grasshopper Zürich, where he was placed in a more fixed defensive role. Over the 2006 summer break, Chihab transferred to FC Sion and back into the role of midfielder. In the 2007 summer  he signed a one-year contract with Neuchâtel Xamax

National team
His appearances for Morocco include the 2004 African Cup of Nations, friendly matches in 2002 and 2004, and 2006 FIFA World Cup qualifying matches against Malawi.

References

External links

1975 births
Living people
Moroccan footballers
Moroccan expatriate footballers
Morocco international footballers
FC Zürich players
Neuchâtel Xamax FCS players
FC Sion players
Grasshopper Club Zürich players
Swiss Super League players
2002 African Cup of Nations players
2004 African Cup of Nations players
Expatriate footballers in Switzerland
Moroccan expatriate sportspeople in Switzerland
People from Mohammedia
Association football defenders